Trump is an unincorporated community in Plain Township, Stark County, Ohio, United States.

Notes

Unincorporated communities in Stark County, Ohio
Unincorporated communities in Ohio